Dadh is a village in the Bhawarna tehsil of Kangra district in Himachal Pradesh State, India.

Notable personalities
 India's first Param Vir Chakra award recipient, Major Somnath Sharma who was posthumously awarded the Param Vir Chakra for his bravery in the Kashmir operations in November 1947 at Budgam.

References 

Villages in Kangra district